The 2013–14 Karlsruher SC season is the 62nd season in the club's football history. In 2013–14 the club plays in the 2. Bundesliga, the second tier of German football.

Matches

Legend

2. Bundesliga

League fixtures and results

League table

DFB-Pokal

References

Karlsruher SC
Karlsruher SC seasons